Riederer is a French/German surname. Notable people with the surname include:

Albert Riederer (1945–2012), American jurist and politician
Johann Riederer (born 1957), German sport shooter
Peter Riederer (born 1942), German neuroscientist
Stefan Riederer (born 1985), German footballer
Sven Riederer (born 1981), Swiss triathlete

German-language surnames